Bragino is a rural locality (a village) in Staroselskoye Rural Settlement, Vologodsky District, Vologda Oblast, Russia. The population was 50 as of 2002.

Geography 
Bragino is located 39 km southwest of Vologda (the district's administrative centre) by road. Khrenovo is the nearest rural locality.

References 

Rural localities in Vologodsky District